Ernst Schmidt (born 13 August 1942) is a Swiss bobsledder. He competed in the four-man event at the 1968 Winter Olympics.

References

1942 births
Living people
Swiss male bobsledders
Olympic bobsledders of Switzerland
Bobsledders at the 1968 Winter Olympics
20th-century Swiss people